Palestrina is a city in Lazio, Italy.

Palestrina may also refer to:
 4850 Palestrina, a minor planet
 Palestrina (opera), a 1917 opera by Hans Pfitzner
 Palestrina - Prince of Music, a 2009 Italian/German music film
 Palestrina, an opera by Johann Sachs
 Palestrina Glacier, Alexander Island, Antarctica
 Giovanni Pierluigi da Palestrina, an Italian Renaissance composer
 Roman Catholic Suburbicarian Diocese of Palestrina, based in the city
 U.S. Palestrina 1919, an Italian association football club